Nathalie Cardone (born 29 March 1967 in Pau, Pyrénées-Atlantiques) is a French actress and singer.

Biography
Cardone was born in Pau, in South-West France. Her father was Sicilian and her mother Spanish. She appeared for the first time on French screens in 1988 in the film Drôle d'endroit pour une rencontre beside Gérard Depardieu and Catherine Deneuve. This first outing gained her a nomination for the César Award for Most Promising Actress in 1989.

Cardone's career launched after a small role in La Petite Voleuse. She found success as a singer with Laurent Boutonnat, famous for his work with Mylene Farmer. She produced several hit singles including "Populaire", "Mon Ange," and — most famously — "Hasta Siempre", a song which honours the Argentinian revolutionary Che Guevara. Her first record sold over 750,000 copies in France.

Discography

Albums

 1999: Nathalie Cardone (# 30 France - Platinum, # 26 Belgium)
 2008: Servir le beau

Singles

References

External links
 

1967 births
Living people
People from Pau, Pyrénées-Atlantiques
French people of Sicilian descent
French people of Spanish descent
French people of Italian descent
French film actresses
French women singers
Spanish-language singers of France
French television actresses